Barnsley is a township in New South Wales, Australia,  west of Newcastle's central business district. It is a suburb of the City of Lake Macquarie local government area.

History 
The Aboriginal people, in this area, the Awabakal, were the first people of this land.

The area was first settled by Europeans in 1829. The town took its name from Barnsley, South Yorkshire, and its public school opened in 1865. In 1911 the population was 216.

References

External links
 History of Barnsley (Lake Macquarie City Library)

Suburbs of Lake Macquarie